Galecki or Gałecki (feminine: Gałecka, plural: Gałeccy) is a Polish-language surname. This surname combined with the suffix -ski and indicated someone who likely hailed from either Galica in Wejherowo, or Galice in the Polish village of Orłów. Noble families with the surname used the Junosza and Prus coats of arms.

The surname may refer to:
 Antoni Gałecki (1906-1958), Polish footballer
 Johnny Galecki (born 1975), American actor
 Tadeusz Gałecki (c. 1871-1937), the real name of Polish politician and activist Andrzej Strug

Polish-language surnames